Kim Yeong-cheol or Kim Yŏng-ch'ŏl is a Korean name consisting of the family name Kim and the given name Yeong-cheol, and may also refer to:

 Kim Yong-chol (born 1946), North Korean general, politician
 Kim Yeong-cheol (actor) (born 1953), South Korean actor
 Kim Young-chul (comedian) (born 1974), South Korean comedian
 Kim Young-chul (footballer) (born 1976), South Korean footballer
Kim Yong-chol (weightlifter), North Korean weightlifter